Hisanori Kitajima (born October 16, 1984) is a Japanese long-distance runner.

University career
Kitajim competed for Toyo University and won a stage of the Hakone Ekiden.

2015 season
He won the 2015 Sydney Marathon with a time of 2:12:44.  He also won the Nobeoka West Japan Marathon.

2016 season
Kitajima finished 2nd at the 2016 Lake Biwa Marathon and was the top finishing runner from Japan.  As this was a qualifying race for the Japanese Olympic Team he earned selection for the 2016 Olympics,  He earned second place by passing Suehiro Ishikawa with one kilometer to go. where he finished 93rd overall.

References

External links
 
 

1984 births
Living people
Japanese male long-distance runners
Japanese male marathon runners
Olympic male marathon runners
Olympic athletes of Japan
Athletes (track and field) at the 2016 Summer Olympics
Japan Championships in Athletics winners
20th-century Japanese people
21st-century Japanese people